The prostitution age of consent is the minimum age at which a person may legally engage in prostitution. Where this is not specified in the individual county's prostitution laws, then the general age of consent laws for that country apply.

Prostitution age of consent by country

See also

 Prostitution law
 Prostitution by region

References

Prostitution law
Prostitution